Irish traditional music sessions are mostly informal gatherings at which people play Irish traditional music. The Irish language word for "session" is seisiún. This article discusses tune-playing, although "session" can also refer to a singing session or a mixed session (tunes and songs).

Barry Foy's Field Guide to the Irish Music Session defines a session as:
...a gathering of Irish traditional musicians for the purpose of celebrating their common interest in the music by playing it together in a relaxed, informal setting, while in the process generally beefing up the mystical cultural mantra that hums along uninterruptedly beneath all manifestations of Irishness worldwide.

Social and cultural aspects

The general session scheme is that someone starts a tune, and those who know it join in.  Good session etiquette requires not playing if one does not know the tune (or at least quietly playing an accompaniment part) and waiting until a tune one knows comes along.  In an "open" session, anyone who is able to play Irish music is welcome.  Most often there are more-or-less recognized session leaders; sometimes there are no leaders.  At times a song will be sung or a slow air played by a single musician between sets.

Locations and times
 
Sessions are usually held in public houses or taverns.  A pub owner might have one or two musicians paid to come regularly in order for the session to have a base. These musicians can perform during any gaps during the day or evening when no other performers are there and wish to play. Sunday afternoons and weekday nights (especially Tuesday and Wednesday) are common times for sessions to be scheduled, on the theory that these are the least likely times for dances and concerts to be held, and therefore the times that professional musicians will be most able to show up.

Sessions can be held in homes or at various public places in addition to pubs; often at a festival sessions will be got together in the beer tent or in the vendor's booth of a music-loving craftsperson or dealer.  When a particularly large musical event "takes over" an entire village, spontaneous sessions may erupt on the street corners. Sessions may also take place occasionally at wakes. House sessions are not as common now as they were in the past. This can be seen in the book Peig by Peig Sayers. In the early stages of the book when Peig was young they often went to sessions at peoples houses in a practice called 'bothántiocht'.

See also 
 List of All-Ireland Fleadh champions
 Irish traditional music
 Pub session

References

Irish music
Food- and drink-related events
Irish culture
Beer culture
Nightlife
Music events